Montana is an unincorporated community in Marion County, West Virginia, United States. Montana is located on the Monongahela River across from Rivesville.

References

Unincorporated communities in Marion County, West Virginia
Unincorporated communities in West Virginia
Coal towns in West Virginia
West Virginia populated places on the Monongahela River